This is a list of National Basketball Association (NBA) franchise post-season appearance streaks. This list includes the all-time and the active consecutive playoffs appearance. Aside from the NBA Playoff appearance streaks, this list also includes the NBA Finals appearance streak and the NBA championships win streak.

On March 24, 1971, the Philadelphia 76ers (formerly known as the Syracuse Nationals) set an NBA record of 22 consecutive playoff appearances in the time between the 1950 NBA playoffs and the 1971 NBA playoffs. The 76ers won two NBA championships during their streak. In 2019 the San Antonio Spurs tied the NBA record of 22 consecutive playoff appearances. The Spurs' streak started in the 1998 NBA playoffs and ended after missing the 2020 NBA playoffs. The Spurs won five NBA championships during their streak.

The Boston Celtics hold the longest consecutive NBA Finals appearance streak with ten appearances between 1957 and 1966.  During the streak, the Celtics won eight consecutive NBA championships—also an NBA record.

Active streaks

NBA Playoffs appearance streaks

This is a list of teams that have active and current consecutive seasons with a playoff appearance.

NBA Playoffs series win streaks

This is a list of teams that have active and current consecutive seasons with a playoff series win.

List updated through the 2022 playoffs.

All-time streaks

NBA Playoffs appearance streaks
Appearance streaks updated through the 2022 playoffs.

NBA Conference Finals appearance streaks
Appearance streaks up to the 2022 playoffs; Includes both the NBA Conference Finals, introduced in 1971, and its predecessor Division Finals.

NBA Finals appearance streaks
Appearance streaks updated through 2022 NBA playoffs.

NBA championships win streaks
Championship streaks up to and including the 2022 NBA playoffs

See also
List of NBA franchise post-season droughts
List of NFL franchise post-season streaks
List of MLB franchise postseason streaks
List of NHL franchise post-season appearance streaks

References
General

Specific

National Basketball Association playoffs
NBA post-season streaks
Post-season streaks